Eldora (pronounced el-DOH-ruh), previously known as "Eldorado" then "El-Dora", then Eldora or Camp Eldorado, and still called Happy Valley, is an unincorporated community and a census-designated place (CDP) located in and governed by Boulder County, Colorado, United States. The CDP is a part of the Boulder, CO Metropolitan Statistical Area. The population of the Eldora CDP was 142 at the United States Census 2010. The Nederland post office (Zip Code 80466) serves the area.

Eldora is located within the Roosevelt National Forest, and is primarily a rural, densely forested, and sparsely populated area. Eldora is tucked into the valley carved by glaciation during the last ice age and by Middle Boulder Creek. From the village there are views up toward the alpine ski runs of Eldora Mountain Resort. A one-time gold camp, Eldora was a shipping point for the Caribou silver mine in nearby Nederland, CO. At present, Eldora is characterized by small cabins, a sprinkling of vacation homes, and several long-shuttered mercantiles.

Points of interest near Eldora include the Eldora Mountain Resort, Eldora Historic District, and Indian Peaks Wilderness. Eldora Historic District has been listed on the U.S. National Register of Historic Places since 1989. The area is home to an abundance of wilderness and wildlife, including animals such as mountain lions, black bears, coyotes, red foxes, mule deer, elk, bobcats, and much more.

The elevation of the town is 8,700 ft., and the highest point is 10,800 ft. Eldora receives a heavy annual snowfall of 300 inches each winter.

To get to Eldora from Boulder, CO, drive 18 miles west of Boulder on CO 119 to Nederland, CO. Continue through Nederland and turn right at the sign for Eldora. This road is CR 130, also known as Eldora Road. The town center of Eldora is approximately 3 miles from this turn.

Etymology  

Eldora was originally named Happy Valley in the 1890s for the discovery of the Happy Valley Placer Mine by John J. Kemp and seven city associates. The town was soon renamed El Dorado, Eldorado or Eldorado Camp. But, as frequently happened at the time, the U.S. Postal Service mistakingly delivered their mail to towns by the same name in other U.S. states, particularly to El Dorado, CA, creating havoc by delaying payroll checks and important papers. Consequently, the U.S. Post Service changed the conflicting name by dropping the last syllable “do” from Colorado’s Eldorado. That name change occurred in 1898, one year after the local post office was established (Feb. 13, 1897), which was in use until it closed in September 1977.

History  

Eldora was first settled by the Arapaho- and Ute people who used the area for hunting during summer. Eldora was originally built as a mining town. Although prospectors had been poking around in Eldora since the early 1850s, it was not until 1875 that enough gold was discovered to open a mine in Eldora. The primary decision to officially establish a town in the 1880s was in part an effort to open up further mining area, and in part an attempt at a through route into Middle Park and Western Colorado. Eldora boomed and prospered during the 1890s, and at one point, Eldora was home to as many as 1300–1500 people in the late 1890s. In 1898, Eldora was home to a bank, a post office, a school, nine hair saloons and seven grocery stores. Although it had a mining life of its own, Eldora also served as a supply center for the camps beyond, and a rail-road shipping center for the camps in the nearby area. The first time the manager of the Bailey Chlorination Mill in Eldora, Mr. Bailey, neglected to pay his workers on time, angry employees promptly gathered at his house, smoked him out, and shot and killed Mr. Bailey. Despite its intensity of gold, silver and tungsten mining, Eldora’s economic boom was brief. It peaked at the turn of the century, but experienced a devastating wildfire in 1899. With much of its timber lost, lumber that was vital to the mining construction was in short supply. The 21st century has experienced renewed interest in Eldora mining, with hopes of reopening the Mogul Tunnel Mine on Spencer Mountain.

Geography
Eldora is a small village located in the southwestern parts of Boulder County, Colorado.  Eldora is located within the Roosevelt National Forest, at the base of Ute Mountains in the Middle Boulder Creek valley. It is situated immediately above the Colorado banana belt. The nearest town is Nederland, Colorado, four miles east of Eldora. From Boulder, CO, you follow Colorado 119 through Boulder Canyon to Nederland, CO, and then head south-west into Eldora.

Demographics

Attractions
Eldora Mountain Resort
Indian Peaks Wilderness
Roosevelt National Forest

See also

Outline of Colorado
Index of Colorado-related articles
State of Colorado
Colorado cities and towns
Colorado census designated places
Colorado counties
Boulder County, Colorado
List of statistical areas in Colorado
Front Range Urban Corridor
North Central Colorado Urban Area
Denver-Aurora-Boulder, CO Combined Statistical Area
Boulder, CO Metropolitan Statistical Area

References

External links

Eldora Mountain Resort
Boulder County website
Indian Peaks Wilderness
Roosevelt National Forest website

Census-designated places in Boulder County, Colorado
Census-designated places in Colorado